Poliosis (also called poliosis circumscripta), is the decrease or absence of melanin (or colour) in head hair, eyebrows, eyelashes or any other hirsute area. It is popularly known as white forelock when it affects hair directly above the forehead.

This condition can cause single or, less commonly, multiple white patches on the hair. Some mistake these white patches for simple birth marks. In poliosis there is decreased or absent melanin in the hair bulbs of affected hair follicles; the melanocytes of the skin are usually not affected.

Associated medical conditions 
Poliosis occurs in several genetic syndromes such as piebaldism, Waardenburg syndrome, neurofibromatosis type I, and tuberous sclerosis. It can also occur in conditions such as vitiligo, Vogt–Koyanagi–Harada disease, alopecia areata, sarcoidosis, and in association with neoplasms and some medications.

Popular culture 

It is sometimes called a Mallen streak, after a fictional family with hereditary poliosis. The Mallen family featured in a sequence of novels by Catherine Cookson, of which The Mallen Streak was the first. She later adapted them into a TV series called The Mallens.

During his tenure as the host of Talk Soup, host John Henson repeatedly referred to his own poliosis as a "skunk spot".

In DC Comics one of Batman's Robins, Jason Todd, is sometimes portrayed with a white forelock.

In Marvel Comics, the X-Men member Rogue has a prominent Mallen streak which is a consistent visual trademark of the character. In her earliest appearances, the character was drawn with a closed-cropped hairdo which had two small white streaks originating above her temples and reaching back over her ears to the back of her head. Over time, she came to be drawn with a larger section of white hair at her forelock, although its size varies greatly from artist to artist. This visual aspect of Rogue's appearance has been consistently portrayed in every adaptation of the character, however, in the 2000 X-Men live action film, Rogue is shown to initially have all brown hair, developing the permanent white streak after being forced to absorb a significant amount of power from Magneto.

The characters Percy Jackson and Annabeth Chase each develop a white streak in their hair from the strain of holding up the sky in The Titan's Curse, the third novel in the book series Percy Jackson and the Olympians.

Cruella De Vil is thought of to have this condition with her half-black/half-white hair.

The main character Jio Fleed of the Satan 666 manga series seems to have the condition.

During his Christmas special, Jeff Dunham was doing a bit with Achmed the Dead Terrorist and mistakenly combined scoliosis with polio, making poliosis.

A Mallen streak is a minor plot point in the 2021 film Don't Breathe 2.

Matt Berry’s character Steven Toast has a Mallen streak.

References

External links 

Human hair color
Dermatologic terminology